= Berkhedi Bazyaft =

- village
- Location within Madhya Pradesh Location within India
- Coordinates: 23.177113°N 77.340175°E
- Country: India
- State: Madhya Pradesh
- District: Bhopal
- Tehsil: Huzur

Population (2011)
  - Total: 985
- Time zone: UTC+5:30 (IST)
- ISO 3166 code: MP-IN
- Census code: 482516

Berkhedi Bazyaft is a village in the Bhopal district of Madhya Pradesh, India. It is located in the Huzur tehsil and the Phanda block.

== Demographics ==
According to the 2011 census of India, Berkhedi Bazyaft has 184 households. The effective literacy rate (i.e. the literacy rate of population excluding children aged 6 and below) is 69.52%.

Demographics (2011 Census)
	Total	Male	Female
Population	985	522	463
Children aged below 6 years	178	91	87
Scheduled caste	164	76	88
Scheduled tribe	96	49	47
Literates	561	339	222
Workers (all)	484	274	210
Main workers (total)	459	266	193
Main workers: Cultivators	191	109	82
Main workers: Agricultural labourers	115	39	76
Main workers: Household industry workers	0	0	0
Main workers: Other	153	118	35
Marginal workers (total)	25	8	17
Marginal workers: Cultivators	3	1	2
Marginal workers: Agricultural labourers	18	5	13
Marginal workers: Household industry workers	0	0	0
Marginal workers: Others	4	2	2
Non-workers	501	248	253
